Rafael Nicanor Farfán Quispe (born 28 December 1975) is a retired Peruvian footballer who played as a defender. He last played for Universidad Técnica de Cajamarca in the 2014 Torneo Descentralizado. He is the brother of Roberto Farfán and
uncle of  Jefferson Farfán.

Club career
Rafael Farfán developed as a player in the Defensor Lima youth  academy.

In 2002, he joined Estudiantes de Medicina. There he made his Torneo Descentralizado debut on 14 July 2002 playing as a forward in Estudiantes' 2–0 win over Alianza Atlético.

He joined Sport Huancayo in January 2010.

International career
Farfán has made 2 appearances for the Peru national football team. He received his first cap on  16 August 2012 at the age of 36. His debut was a friendly match away to Costa Rica and finished in a 0–1 win for Peru.

References

External links

1975 births
Living people
Footballers from Lima
Peruvian footballers
Peru international footballers
Peruvian Primera División players
Estudiantes de Medicina footballers
Club Deportivo Universidad César Vallejo footballers
Sport Áncash footballers
Deportivo Municipal footballers
Coronel Bolognesi footballers
Alianza Atlético footballers
Sport Huancayo footballers
Association football defenders